The Cook County Treasurer is the treasurer of county government in Cook County, Illinois

Office description
The Cook County Treasurer oversees what is the United States' second-largest system of property tax collection and distribution. The office was established in 1831, and since 1835 has been an elected, partisan position. The inaugural holder of the office of treasurer was Archibald Clybourn, an early settler of Cook County.

The treasurer holds responsibility for printing and mailing bills based on data they are provided by other county and state agencies regarding assessments, exemptions, and tax rate.

The treasurer is responsible for the collection of $12 billion in taxes annually from owners of over 1.8 million parcels of property.

The treasurer is responsible for the distribution of tax funds to approximately 2,200 local government agencies with the jurisdiction to collect taxes, including school districts, municipalities, townships, park systems, forest preserve systems, libraries, public health and safety agencies, election authorities, economic-development agencies, and public-works bonds.

The treasurer needs to maintain an investment policy and strategy.

The treasurer is tasked with receiving and safely keeping revenues and other public funds of the county, and all other money authorized by the law to be paid to them, and to disburse these funds in accordance to the law.

Under state law, to assist them with the execution of their duties, the treasurer appoints deputies, assistants, and personnel.

The treasurer must file regular reports with the president of the Cook County Board of Commissioners providing summary of the financial status of their office.

The treasurer also, per state law, oversees the process of refunding overpayment of taxes.

Officeholders

Recent election results

|-
| colspan=16 style="text-align:center;" |Cook County Treasurer general elections
|-
!Year
!Winning candidate
!Party
!Vote (pct)
!Opponent
!Party
! Vote (pct)
!Opponent
!Party
! Vote (pct)
!Opponent
!Party
! Vote (pct)
|-
|1986
| | Edward J. Rosewell
| | Democratic
| | 905,190 (68.78%)
| | Richard M. Hetzer
| | Republican
| | 410,909	(31.22%)
| 
| 
| 
| 
| 
| 
|-
|1990
| | Edward J. Roswell
| | Democratic
| | 710,699 (58.03%)
| | Thomas D. Eilers
| | Republican
| | 357,673	(29.21%)
|Text style="background:#D2B48C | Charles W. Alexander
|Text style="background:#D2B48C | Harold Washington Party
|Text style="background:#D2B48C | 156,294 (12.76%)
| 
| 
| 
|-
|1994
| | Edward J. Roswell
| | Democratic
| | 
| | Jean Reyes Pechette
| | Republican
| | 
|Text style="background:#D2B48C | Robert J. Pettis
|Text style="background:#D2B48C | Harold Washington Party
|Text style="background:#D2B48C | 
| John Justice
| Populist
| 
|-
|1998
| | Maria Pappas
| | Democratic
| | 978,373 (77.79%)
| | Anthony Peraica
| | Republican
| | 279,355 (22.21%)
| 
| 
| 
| 
| 
| 
|-
|2002
| | Maria Pappas
| | Democratic
| | 998,480 (76.20%)
| | Richard J. Daniels
| | Republican
| | 311,787 (23.80%)
| 
| 
| 
| 
| 
| 
|-
|2006
| | Maria Pappas
| | Democratic
| | 1,074,756 (83.70%)
| | Erik Peck
| | Republican
| | 209,253 (16.30%)
| 
| 
| 
| 
| 
| 
|-
|2010
| | Maria Pappas
| | Democratic
| | 1,042,318 (77.21%)
| | Carol A. Morse
| | Republican
| | 307,612 (22.79%)
| 
| 
|
| 
| 
| 
|-
|2014
| | Maria Pappas
| | Democratic
| | 1,048,234 (100%)
| 
| 
| 
| 
| 
| 
| 
| 
| 
|-
|2018
| | Maria Pappas
| | Democratic
| | 1,447,145 (99.26%)
| Others
| Write-ins
| 10,780 (0.74%)
| 
| 
| 
| 
| 
| 
|-
|2022
| |Maria Pappas
| | Democratic
| |1,063,160 (75.41%)
| | Peter Kopsaftis
| | Republican
| | 314,013 (22.28%)
| | Michael Murphy
| | Libertarian
| | 32,577 (2.31%)
| 
| 
|

References